Ottinge is a hamlet located NNW of Folkestone in Kent, England. It lies less than one mile (1 km) from the village of Lyminge and occupies a site at a crossroads between that village and Elham (where, at the 2011 Census, the population was included).

Hamlets in Kent